aka Female Bodies in a Brutal Scenario is a 1967 Japanese pink film directed by Masanao Sakao. It is significant for being future "S&M Queen" Naomi Tani's first starring role in a film dealing primarily with S&M.

Synopsis
Yōko is a young woman who is forced into prostitution by a yakuza gang. She repeatedly escapes from the gang, and is repeatedly captured, and repeatedly tortured at length.

Cast
 Naomi Tani as Yōko
 Sachiko Inoue
 Miki Hayashi as Harue
 Jōji Nagaoka as Asada
 Akio Shirakawa as Akagawa
 Sanpei Nawa as Aoki
 Hiroko Fuji

Background
Director Masanao Sakao filmed Cruel Map of Women's Bodies for Ōkura Eiga and it was released theatrically in Japan by that studio on October 28, 1967. Sakao made several films about prostitutes throughout his career. In Virgins With Bad Reputations (1967), he directed Naomi Tani again, as a former prostitute trying to escape her past. Sakao found his greatest success at Nihon Cinema studio with Virgins and Pimp (1968).

Actress Naomi Tani, who would become known as the "Queen" of S&M film had her first experience with cinematic S&M theme in director Kin'ya Ogawa's Memoirs Of A Modern Female Doctor (also 1967). However, Cruel Map of Women's Bodies was her first film which fully explored S&M as its central theme.

Bibliography

English

Japanese

Notes

1967 films
1960s Japanese-language films
OP Eiga films
Pink films
1960s Japanese films